Alor Michil (English translation: Procession of Light) is a 1974 Bangladeshi patriotic film which focuses on the independence movement of 1971. Written and directed by Narayan Ghosh Mita, it stars Abdur Razzak, Babita, Farooque and Anwar Hussain in lead roles. It has been selected for preservation by the Bangladesh Film Archive.

Cast
 Abdur Razzak
 Farooque
 Bobita
 Anwar Hossain
 Rabiul Alam
 Hashmot

Soundtrack

References

1974 films
1974 drama films
Bengali-language Bangladeshi films
Bangladeshi drama films
Films scored by Satya Saha
1970s Bengali-language films
Films directed by Narayan Ghosh Mita
Films based on the Bangladesh Liberation War